Lignano Riviera is a frazione of the city of Lignano Sabbiadoro, comune in the province of Udine, in the Friuli-Venezia Giulia region of north-eastern Italy. It is one of the main summer resorts in northern Italy.

See also
 Lignano Sabbiadoro
 Lignano Pineta

Districts of Lignano Sabbiadoro